Eleanor Holmes Norton (born June 13, 1937) is an American lawyer and politician serving as a delegate to the United States House of Representatives, representing the District of Columbia since 1991. She is a member of the Democratic Party.

Early life and education 
Eleanor K. Holmes was born in Washington, D.C., the daughter of Vela (née Lynch), a schoolteacher, and Coleman Holmes, a civil servant. While a student at Dunbar High School she was elected junior class president and was a member of the National Honor Society.   She attended Antioch College (B.A. 1960), Yale University (M.A. in American Studies 1963) and Yale Law School (LL.B. 1964).

While in college and graduate school, she was active in the civil rights movement and an organizer for the Student Nonviolent Coordinating Committee. By the time she graduated from Antioch, she had already been arrested for organizing and participating in sit-ins in Washington, D.C., Maryland, and Ohio. While in law school, she traveled to Mississippi for the Mississippi Freedom Summer and worked with civil rights stalwarts such as Medgar Evers. Her first encounter with a recently released but physically beaten Fannie Lou Hamer forced her to bear witness to the intensity of violence and Jim Crow repression in the South. Her time with the SNCC inspired her lifelong commitment to social activism and her budding sense of feminism. She contributed the piece "For Sadie and Maud" to the 1970 anthology Sisterhood is Powerful: An Anthology of Writings From The Women's Liberation Movement, edited by Robin Morgan. Norton was on the founding advisory board of the Women's Rights Law Reporter (founded 1970), the first legal periodical in the United States to focus exclusively on the field of women's rights law. In the early 1970s, Norton was a signer of the Black Woman's Manifesto, a classic document of the Black feminist movement.

Career before Congress 

Upon graduation from law school, she worked as a law clerk to Federal District Court Judge A. Leon Higginbotham, Jr. In 1965, she became the assistant legal director of the American Civil Liberties Union, a position she held until 1970. In 1970, Norton represented sixty female employees of Newsweek who had filed a claim with the Equal Employment Opportunity Commission (EEOC) that Newsweek had a policy of allowing only men to be reporters. The women won, and Newsweek agreed to allow women to be reporters.

Holmes Norton specialized in freedom of speech cases, and her work included winning a Supreme Court case on behalf of the National States' Rights Party, a victory she put into perspective in an interview with one of the District of Columbia Bar's website editors: "I defended the First Amendment, and you seldom get to defend the First Amendment by defending people you like ... You don't know whether the First Amendment is alive and well until it is tested by people with despicable ideas. And I loved the idea of looking a racist in the face—remember this was a time when racism was much more alive and well than it is today—and saying, 'I am your lawyer, sir, what are you going to do about that?'" She worked as an adjunct assistant professor at New York University Law School from 1970 to 1971. In 1970, Mayor John Lindsay appointed her as the head of the New York City Human Rights Commission, and she held the first hearings in the country on discrimination against women. Prominent feminists from throughout the country came to New York City to testify, while Norton used the platform as a means of raising public awareness about the application of the Civil Rights Act of 1964 to women and sex discrimination.

President Jimmy Carter appointed Holmes Norton as the chair of the EEOC in 1977; she became the first female head of the agency. Norton released the EEOC's first set of regulations outlining what constituted sexual harassment and declaring that sexual harassment was indeed a form of sexual discrimination that violated federal civil rights laws.

She has also served as a senior fellow of the Urban Institute. Norton became a professor at Georgetown University Law Center in 1982. During this time, she was a vocal anti-apartheid activist in the U.S., and was a part of the Free South Africa Movement.

In 1990, Norton, along with 15 other African American women and one man, formed African-American Women for Reproductive Freedom.

She contributed the piece "Notes of a Feminist Long Distance Runner" to the 2003 anthology Sisterhood Is Forever: The Women's Anthology for a New Millennium, edited by Robin Morgan.

She received a Foremother Award for her lifetime of accomplishments from the National Research Center for Women & Families in 2011.

Delegate to Congress 

Norton was elected in 1990 as a Democratic delegate to the House of Representatives. She defeated city council member Betty Ann Kane in the primary despite the last-minute revelation that Norton and her husband, both lawyers, had failed to file D.C. income tax returns between 1982 and 1989.  The Nortons paid over $80,000 in back taxes and fines. Her campaign manager was Donna Brazile. The delegate position was open because Del. Walter Fauntroy was running for mayor rather than seeking reelection. Norton received 39 percent of the vote in the Democratic primary election, and 59 percent of the vote in the general election. Norton took office on January 3, 1991, and has been reelected every two years since.

Delegates to Congress are entitled to sit in the House of Representatives and vote in committee, and to offer amendments in the Committee of the Whole, but are not allowed to take part in legislative floor votes. The district and four U.S. territories—Guam, American Samoa, the Northern Mariana Islands, and the U.S. Virgin Islands—send delegates to Congress; the Resident Commissioner of Puerto Rico has the same rights as delegates.

William Thomas and the White House Peace Vigil inspired Norton to introduce the Nuclear Disarmament and Economic Conversion Act, which would require the United States to disable and dismantle its nuclear weapons at such time as all other nations possessing nuclear weapons do likewise. Norton has been introducing a version of the bill since 1994.

Legislation strongly supported by Norton that would grant the District of Columbia a voting representative in the House, the District of Columbia House Voting Rights Act of 2009, was passed by the United States Senate on February 26, 2009. However, the legislation stalled in the House and failed to pass prior to the end of the 111th Congress.

The legislation proposed in 2009 did not grant Norton the right to vote in the 111th Congress, as she would have had to remain in her elected office of delegate for the duration of her two-year term.

In September 2010, the national press criticized Norton after the release of a voice message in which she solicited campaign funds from a lobbyist representing a project that she oversaw. Norton countered that the message was typical of appeals made by all members of Congress and that the call was made from campaign offices not paid for by taxpayers. In March 2012, the public radio series This American Life featured the voicemail message at the start of a program on lobbying titled "Take the Money and Run for Office".

In May 2012, Norton was blocked from testifying on an anti-abortion bill in her district—the second time she has been blocked from speaking about abortion. She insisted that it was a denial of a common courtesy. Representative Jerrold Nadler supported Norton's protest, saying "Never in my 20 years as a member of Congress have I seen a colleague treated so contemptuously."

In August 2014, after the D.C. Board of Elections voted to put a question about marijuana legalization on the ballot in November 2014, Norton vowed to defend against any congressional attempt to stop the district from voting on the issue and to, if approved, fight any attempt to prevent implementation.

She is a member of the Congressional Progressive Caucus and the Congressional Black Caucus.

Committee assignments
Committee on Oversight and Government Reform
Subcommittee on Federal Workforce, Post Office, and the District of Columbia
Subcommittee on Information Policy, Census, and National Archives
Committee on Transportation and Infrastructure
Subcommittee on Aviation
Subcommittee on Economic Development, Public Buildings and Emergency Management
Subcommittee on Water Resources and Environment

Caucus memberships
Congressional Progressive Caucus
Congressional Black Caucus
 House Baltic Caucus
 Congressional Arts Caucus
 Congressional Freethought Caucus
 Climate Solutions Caucus
 U.S.-Japan Caucus
Medicare for All Caucus
Blue Collar Caucus

Legislation sponsored
On July 8, 2013, Norton sponsored  (An act to designate the Douglas A. Munro Coast Guard Headquarters Building (H.R. 2611; 113th Congress)) to name the new Coast Guard headquarters after Munro, the United States Coast Guard's only Medal of Honor recipient.
On October 28, 2013, Norton sponsored  (To amend the District of Columbia Home Rule Act to clarify the rules regarding the determination of the compensation of the Chief Financial Officer of the District of Columbia), a bill that would increase the cap on D.C.'s CFO pay from $199,700 to around $250,000.
On March 10, 2014, Norton sponsored the District of Columbia Courts, Public Defender Service, and Court Services and Offender Supervision Agency Act of 2014 (H.R. 4185; 113th Congress), a bill that would make changes to the District of Columbia Official Code that governs the D.C. Courts system. Norton argued that the bill "will help make our local justice process more efficient and, therefore, more effective for the residents of the District."

Legislation supported
Norton supported the Digital Accountability and Transparency Act of 2014 (S. 994; 113th Congress), a bill that would make information on federal expenditures more easily accessible and transparent. The bill would require the U.S. Department of the Treasury to establish common standards for financial data provided by all government agencies and to expand the amount of data that agencies must provide to the government website, USASpending. Norton said that the bill "will improve the quality of data that agencies make available about their spending."
Norton supported the bill "To amend the Act entitled An Act to regulate the height of buildings in the District of Columbia to clarify the rules of the District of Columbia regarding human occupancy of penthouses above the top story of the building upon which the penthouse is placed". The bill would increase the height limit of penthouses in D.C. to 20 feet, allowing for human occupancy. Norton said that "this bill is not a mandate directing the city to make any changes to penthouses or to its existing comprehensive plan or local zoning laws more generally."

Appearances 

On July 27, 2006, Norton appeared on the "Better Know a District" segment of Comedy Central's The Colbert Report, in which she spiritedly defended the District of Columbia's claim to being a part of the United States. She also appeared on the joint The Colbert Report/The Daily Show "Midterm Midtacular" special on November 7, 2006. Norton gave further interviews to Stephen Colbert on March 22, 2007, and April 24, 2007, on the subject of representation in the District of Columbia. On February 12, 2008, Colbert and Norton discussed her status as a superdelegate as well as her support of Barack Obama for president. She appeared once again on February 11, 2009, to discuss D.C. representation and promised Colbert that she would make him an honorary citizen of Washington, D.C., and give him a key to the city, if D.C. citizens were given representation. Colbert in turn gave Norton a "TV promise" that he would be there should that happen. Norton made a further appearance on Colbert's show on June 25, 2014, where she discussed the impact that African-American Democrats had on incumbent Thad Cochran's primary defeat of Chris McDaniel, a Tea Party candidate, as well as Colbert's final episode among a cadre of past guests.

On June 27, 2008, Norton appeared on Democracy Now! to discuss the Supreme Court's ruling in District of Columbia v. Heller, which she strongly opposed. On December 5, 2014, Norton appeared on Hannity to discuss the shooting death of Michael Brown in Ferguson, Missouri, on which she admitted she did not read the evidence of the case, but criticized the racial profiling of young African Americans.

Legislation regarding NFL tax-exempt status
On October 2, 2014, ABC News reported that Holmes Norton, discussing her co-sponsorship of a bill aimed at changing the National Football League's tax-exempt status, stated: "The NFL greed is so widespread that they've chosen to operate as a tax-exempt organization. So we want to take that choice away from them unless, and until, they decide not to profit from a name that has now officially been declared a racial slur." In essence, Holmes Norton's position was that until the NFL forced the Washington Redskins owner (Daniel Marc Snyder) to change the team name she would support legislation that would change the NFL's tax status thereby costing the league money.

In popular culture

Eleanor Holmes Norton is portrayed by Joy Bryant in Amazon Video's original series Good Girls Revolt and by Donna Biscoe in the HBO original movie Confirmation.

She is featured in the feminist history film She's Beautiful When She's Angry.

Personal life
Norton was married to Edward Norton, who died in 2014. She has two children; John, and Katherine who has Down syndrome. Norton is Episcopalian.

Awards
Foremother Award from National Center for Health Research, 2011 
Coretta Scott King Legacy Award from the Coretta Scott King Center for Cultural and Intellectual Freedom, 2017
Honoree, National Women's History Alliance, 2020

See also
List of African-American United States representatives
Women in the United States House of Representatives

References

Further reading

External links 

 Congresswoman Eleanor Holmes Norton official U.S. House website
 
 

 SNCC Digital Gateway: Eleanor Holmes Norton, Documentary website created by the SNCC Legacy Project and Duke University, telling the story of the Student Nonviolent Coordinating Committee & grassroots organizing from the inside-out
 History and powers of DC's Delegate to Congress
 The Colbert Report: Better Know a District – District of Columbia – Eleanor Holmes Norton Pt. 1

|-

1937 births
20th-century American Episcopalians
20th-century American politicians
21st-century American politicians
21st-century American women politicians
African-American Episcopalians
African-American feminists
African-American members of the United States House of Representatives
African-American people in Washington, D.C., politics
African-American women in politics
American feminists
American lawyers
American women lawyers
Antioch College alumni
Chairs of the Equal Employment Opportunity Commission
Delegates to the United States House of Representatives from the District of Columbia
Democratic Party members of the United States House of Representatives from the District of Columbia
Female members of the United States House of Representatives
Georgetown University Law Center faculty
Living people
New York University faculty
Washington, D.C., Democrats
Women in Washington, D.C., politics
Yale Law School alumni
American women legal scholars
20th-century American women politicians
American women academics
20th-century African-American women
20th-century African-American politicians
21st-century African-American women